Jonathan Angelito Salah Rivas-Marouani (born 25 January 1992) is a French professional footballer who plays as a forward for  club Bourg-en-Bresse.

Club career
Born in La Seyne-sur-Mer, Rivas trained with Club de Bourges, winning the national U14 championship with the club. He spent two years at the training centre of Chamois Niortais before joining the Châteauroux, where he spent five years. He made his debut for the senior team on 26 April 2013, in a 0–0 Ligue 2 game against Auxerre. He signed his first professional contract with the club in the summer of 2013. In January 2014, he joined CA Bastia until the end of the 2013–14 season, in order to secure more game time. He scored his first senior goal whilst on loan at CA Bastia, the only goal in a 1–0 Ligue 2 win against Nancy on 17 January 2014.

In January 2015, Rivas left Châteauroux, signing an eighteen-month contract with Clermont. After having only made four league appearances in the first half of the 2015–16 season, he agreed to leave Clermont on a loan deal with Les Herbiers until the end of the season.

Rivas left Clermont at the end of his contract, and after a trial joined Pau in September 2016. After two seasons during which he played the majority of Championnat National games, in June 2018 he joined Lyon-Duchère (which rebranded to SC Lyon in June 2020).

On 22 November 2021, Rivas moved to Bourg-en-Bresse.

Personal life
Rivas was born in France to a Spanish father and a Tunisian mother.

Career statistics

References

External links

1992 births
Living people
People from La Seyne-sur-Mer
Sportspeople from Var (department)
Association football forwards
French footballers
French sportspeople of Tunisian descent
French people of Spanish descent
Ligue 2 players
Championnat National players
CA Bastia players
LB Châteauroux players
Clermont Foot players
Les Herbiers VF players
Pau FC players
Lyon La Duchère players
Football Bourg-en-Bresse Péronnas 01 players
Footballers from Provence-Alpes-Côte d'Azur